Diyar-e-Dil is a Pakistani television series produced by Momina Duraid, aired on Hum TV. It is based on the novel of same name by Farhat Ishtiaq. The series is directed by Haseeb Hassan. Diyar-e-Dil focuses on the issue of split family with broken relations. The story concludes a moral lessons regarding respect, love and care in relationships.

Episodes

Note
  Station did not report the data for particular episode.
  Figure exceeding 100 represents viewership in millions.

References

External links
 
 

Diyar-e-Dil
Lists of Pakistani television series episodes
Lists of drama television series episodes